Aleksandar Tomash (born 2 September 1978 in Veliko Tarnovo) is a Bulgarian football manager and former player.

During his playing career as a defender, he made several appearances for CSKA Sofia, OFI Crete, Metalurh Zaporizhya, Cherno More Varna, FC Baku, Slavia Sofia, Beroe Stara Zagora and Etar 1924 Veliko Tarnovo.

Coaching career
After serving as assistant to Ivko Ganchev at Beroe during the 2012/2013 season, Tomash began his coaching career at Bansko, leading the team for 2 years, before moving to Lokomotiv GO.

Vereya Stara Zagora
On 10 June 2016 he was appointed as manager at the newly promoted to First Professional League team Vereya. The team finished on 10th position in the regular season and qualified for the Relegation Group A. Vereya finished 1st in the group and qualified for the European play-off.

Beroe Stara Zagora
On 23 May 2017 Tomash was announced as the new manager of the other Stara Zagora team - Beroe, taking over the coaching duties at the team from 1 June.

Lokomotiv Plovdiv
On 11 April 2022, Tomash was appointed as manager of Lokomotiv Plovdiv.

Managerial statistics

Honours

Club 
CSKA Sofia
 A Group: 1996–97, 2002–03
 Bulgarian Cup: 1997, 1999

Baku
 Azerbaijan Premier League: 2008–09

Etar 1924
 B Group: 2011–12

References

External links 
 
 
 

1978 births
Living people
Bulgarian footballers
Bulgaria international footballers
Bulgarian expatriate footballers
Association football defenders
First Professional Football League (Bulgaria) players
Super League Greece players
Ukrainian Premier League players
PFC CSKA Sofia players
OFI Crete F.C. players
FC Metalurh Zaporizhzhia players
PFC Cherno More Varna players
FC Baku players
PFC Slavia Sofia players
PFC Beroe Stara Zagora players
FC Etar 1924 Veliko Tarnovo players
Expatriate footballers in Azerbaijan
Expatriate footballers in Greece
Expatriate footballers in Ukraine
Bulgarian football managers
People from Veliko Tarnovo
PFC Beroe Stara Zagora managers
Bulgarian expatriate sportspeople in Azerbaijan
Sportspeople from Veliko Tarnovo Province